The Lockheed P-38 Lighting is an American two-engine fighter used by the United States Army Air Forces and other Allied air forces during World War II. Of the 10,037 planes built, 26 survive today, 22 of which are located in the United States, and 10 of which are airworthy.

Background
In late 1945 when the last P-38 came off the production line, 9,923 aircraft had been delivered to the USAAF. The P-38 was quickly declared obsolete in 1946 and the last USAF flight was in 1948.

This was an extremely complicated aircraft to maintain. The P-38 Lightning has been consistently on the civil registry since 1946 since the first aircraft were released from the military. It does remain a demanding aircraft with numerous crash incidents; several of the surviving planes have been rebuilt many times.

A considerable number of late model Lightnings which had been converted by Lockheed to Photo Reconnaissance (F-5) models found a niche with photo mapping companies and until the middle 1960s these aircraft earned their keep through photo mapping assignments around the globe. Additionally, the latest military use of the P-38 was with several South American air forces, the largest of these being  which operated the Lockheed Lightning until the early 1960s. There were also a small number of P-38s that were purchased after the war for civilian air racing. It is from these sources that until the early 1980s all the remaining stocks of the P-38 Lightning could be drawn from.

One historic note was that in 1948, representatives of the then-new country of South Korea attempted to purchase the brand new P-38L Lightnings stored in the Philippines (approximately 100 aircraft). Instead, the USAF persuaded them to accept AT-6s modified to ground attack role as well as worn out P-51D Mustangs; the brand new P-38s were destroyed.

As with all remaining warbirds, collectors began scouring the world for forgotten aircraft. From the jungle of New Guinea, the wildness of Alaska and under the ice of Greenland are but some of the places previously-unrestorable wrecked airframes are being recovered and being restored for both static display and airworthy exhibition.

Individual histories

Glacier Girl (41-7630), this P-38F-1 flown by 1st Lt. Harry L. Smith, Jr., 94th Fighter Squadron, was one of six P-38 fighters of the 1st Fighter Group escorting two B-17 bombers on a ferry flight to the United Kingdom as part of Operation Bolero on 15 July 1942. While en route over Greenland, bad weather caused the eight aircraft to turn back, the entire flight attempting to land together before they ran out of fuel. Although one P-38 overturned, the flight successfully belly-landed. The crews were rescued within a few days, but the airplanes were abandoned and, over the years, covered by ice. A few attempts to salvage the airplanes were made but were unsuccessful. In 1981 Pat Epps of Epps Aviation in Atlanta Ga and Richard Taylor an Atlanta Architect bought the salvage rights from Roy Degan who had gotten them from the Danish Government to search for the planes. They formed the Greenland Expedition Society. Don Brooks, a south Georgia businessman, joined the team in 1986 and bought a DC3 to help with the recovery. Joined to this were the efforts of many adventurers, aviation enthusiasts, and investors. It took seven trips and almost two million dollars to recover the plane. In 1992, 50 years after the planes landed, a P-38 recovery mission was undertaken. Using photos taken by the original crews while they were awaiting rescue as well as modern seismographic equipment, the salvage workers located the buried squadron and selected the least damaged of the planes. They reached it by boring a hole using hot water through the layer of ice 268 feet thick. Roy Shoffner, a businessman from Middlesboro, Kentucky was the major investor of the 1992 expedition. He also gets credit for 100% of the restoration of Glacier Girl.  The airplane was transported to Middlesboro, where a ten-year restoration began using many parts from late model aircraft. Nicknamed Glacier Girl, the restored P-38F Lightning made its first post-restoration flight on 26 October 2002.
Maid of Harlech (41-7677) P-38F-1LO ex-49th Squadron, 14th Fighter Group, 8th Air Force, in the summer of 2007 this aircraft was discovered on a beach in Wales, having been buried in the sand for 65 years. A wingtip had come off the aircraft during its belly landing, but the pilot—Second Lt. Robert F. 'Fred' Elliot—escaped unhurt. Elliot was on a gunnery practice mission when a fuel supply error forced him to make an emergency landing. American airmen salvaged the nose guns but were unable to fly the fighter off the beach, abandoning it in place where it became covered by naturally shifting sand. Elliot was shot down less than three months later while flying combat missions over Tunisia. His body and aircraft were never found.

Survivors

Australia
Under restoration
P-38F
42-12647 Dottie from Brooklyn - Under restoration to display by the Historical Aircraft Restoration Society for the Papua New Guinea National Museum and Art Gallery in Port Moresby, Papua New Guinea.
P-38G
42-12847 Dumbo! - Under restoration to display by the Historical Aircraft Restoration Society for the Pima Air & Space Museum in Tucson, Arizona.
P-38
Unknown - Under restoration to airworthiness by the Historical Aircraft Restoration Society in Albion Park, New South Wales.

Austria
Airworthy
P-38L
44-53254 – The Flying Bulls in Salzburg. Formerly called "White Lightnin'" and owned until 2008 by Marvin L. "Lefty" Gardner. Gardner, along with Lloyd Noland,  cofounded what is now the Commemorative Air Force. Registered to Aircraft Guaranty Title Corp. Trustee in Onalaska, Texas.

Serbia
Under restoration
P-38L
44-25786 – Museum of Aviation in Belgrade. In storage, awaiting restoration.

United Kingdom
Under restoration
P-38H
42-66841 – Sold and transported to the United Kingdom during late 2014 where it will reportedly be restored to airworthy condition. Possibly painted with the nose art "Scarlet Scourge".

United States
Airworthy
P-38F
41-7630 Glacier Girl – based at Lewis Air Legends in San Antonio, Texas.
42-12652 White 33 – based at the National Museum of World War II Aviation in Colorado Springs, Colorado.
P-38J
44-23314 23 Skidoo – based at Planes of Fame in Chino, California.
P-38L
44-26981 Honey Bunny – based at Allied Fighters in Sun Valley, Idaho.
44-27053 Relampago – based at War Eagles Air Museum in Santa Teresa, New Mexico.
44-27083 Tangerine – based at Erickson Aircraft Collection in Madras, Oregon.
44-27183 (unnamed) – based at Yanks Air Museum in Chino, California.
44-27231 Scat III (Formerly  Ruff Stuff) – based at Fagen Fighters WWII Museum in Granite Falls, Minnesota.
44-53095 Thoughts of Midnite – privately owned in Houston, Texas.
44-53186 "Pudgy V" – based at Collings Foundation in Stow, Massachusetts.

On display
P-38G
42-13400 (unnamed) – Joint Base Elmendorf-Richardson (formerly Elmendorf AFB) in Anchorage, Alaska; crash landed on Attu Island in 1945, recovered in 1999.
P-38J
42-67638 (unnamed) – Hill Aerospace Museum at Hill AFB, Utah.
42-67762 (unnamed) – Steven F. Udvar-Hazy Center of the National Air and Space Museum in Chantilly, Virginia.
P-38L

44-53015 Pudgy V – McGuire AFB, New Jersey.
44-53087 Marge – EAA AirVenture Museum in Oshkosh, Wisconsin.<ref>"P-38L Lightning/44-53087" EAA Airventure Museum Retrieved: 8 October 2012.</ref>
44-53097 Lizzie V / Wyandotte Mich. – Museum of Flight in Seattle, Washington."FAA Registry: N3JB" FAA.gov Retrieved: 15 July 2021.
44-53232 (unnamed) – National Museum of the United States Air Force at Wright-Patterson AFB in Dayton, Ohio.
44-53236 Marge – Richard I. Bong Veterans Historical Center in Superior, Wisconsin.

Under restoration or in storage
P-38H
42-66534 – to airworthiness by private owner in Wilmington, Delaware.
P-38J
42-103988 Jandina III – to airworthiness by WestPac Restorations for the National Museum of World War II Aviation in Colorado Springs, Colorado.
42-104088 – in storage at the Flying Heritage Collection in Everett, Washington.
P-38L
44-26761 – in storage at Fantasy of Flight in Polk City, Florida.

See also
List of Lockheed P-38 Lightning operators
Lockheed XP-49
Lockheed XP-58 Chain Lightning
Northrop P-61 Black Widow

References

 Notes 

Bibliography

 United States Air Force Museum Guidebook.''  Wright-Patterson AFB, Ohio: Air Force Museum Foundation, 1975.

External links

 FAA's P-38 registrations
 Warbird Registry
 Pacific Wrecks website
  Lockheed P-38 'Lightning' – Aviation Enthusiast Corner

P-038 Lightning survivors
Lockheed P-38 Lightnings